The Patomskiy crater or Patom crater (Patomskiy Krater), also known as , Konus Kolpakova  "Kolpakov cone") is a peculiar rock formation located in the Bodaibo District of the Irkutsk region of southeastern Siberia,  from the district center Bodaibo. It is a large mound made of shattered limestone blocks on the slopes of the Patom Highlands in an area of dense taiga.

The Patomskiy crater was discovered in 1949 by Russian geologist Vadim Kolpakov. Its origins have been subject of intense scientific interest, with hypotheses including meteorite, volcanic and gaseous origin, but to date no definite proof has been given. Through dendrochronology, the age of the crater is estimated to be 300 years old.

Theories of origin
Until recently, some scientists believed that the crater presents a large footprint of an ultra-dense  meteorite, which had sunk underground upon impact. Another hypothesis was that it is a fragment of the Tunguska meteorite. Others believed that the crater is a result of a breakthrough of a deep pocket of natural gas. Several scientific expeditions have been sent to the crater but the nature of its origin remains a mystery. Astronomers and geophysicists from the Irkutsk State Technical University, geochemists from the Institute of Geosphere Dynamics, RAS (Moscow),  still believe that the crater may have a meteoric origin. A study conducted by V. S. Antipin and A. M. Fedorov showed, through morphological, structural and chemical data, that the crater is volcanic in origin. The presence of weathered breccias, the diameter/height ratio typical of volcanic cones, the absence of geochemical anomalies linked to cosmogenic origins, and its zoning of different ages, contradict clearly the meteorite hypotesis. The origin of the cone is therefore volcanic, caused by a rapid outbreak of deep fluids (CO2 and H2O) and gases (CO and H2).

Patom Crater Conference, 2010
In 2010, Saint Petersburg Mining Institute held a scientific conference "Patom Crater 2010". Viktor Sergeyevich Antipin, head of a department at the St. Petersburg Institute of Geochemistry of the Russian Academy of Sciences (IG SB RAS), stated that "Since the 2006 expedition by the Institute of Geochemistry (IGC), RAS came to the conclusion that the Patomskiy crater probably originates from geological processes. An important fact is that no serious argument or evidence of a meteorite crater nature referred to by specialists had been given. There was not any new evidence to support the meteorite hypothesis." Antipin further noted that at the conference, for the first time, all the experts rejected the meteoric hypothesis. "Now it has only historical interest," he added.

According to studies by Siberian scientists, the crater formed only 300 to 350 years ago. The zoning of the crater was caused by geological processes and intensive introduction of deep gas flows of matter, which led to the transformation of silicate rocks within the crater. "An important confirmation of these ideas were the result of geophysics from Saint Petersburg Mining University and Yekaterinburg [Institute of Geophysics, UB RAS]. Performing gravimetric and geoelectrical investigations, they also came to the firm conviction that Patom crater has an origin of an endogenetic nature," said Antipin. According to geophysicists of St. Petersburg and Yekaterinburg, meteorite impact craters have a very different shape, and Patom crater is not one of them, he added.

See also

 Lake Baikal
 Ed Stafford: Into The Unknown (Episode 2 - Siberia)

References

External links

(in English)
 
 englishrussia.com article 2013/05/27

(in Russian)
 Ученые отвергли метеоритное происхождение Патомского кратера в Сибири 08/04/2011 
 Видео. Лекция прочитана 26 февраля 2009 года в Москве, в ФИАНе
 Экспедиция «Комсомольской правды» и Сибирского отделения РАН при участии Первого канала
 Открыта тайна Патомского кратера
 Patomskiy crater on YouTube 
 Патомский кратер В «Гнезде огненного орла»

Landforms of Irkutsk Oblast
Landforms of Russia
Unexplained phenomena